Pablo Martín Lacoste Icardi (born 15 January 1988) is a Uruguayan footballer who currently plays for C.A. Cerro.

References

External links

1988 births
Living people
Uruguayan footballers
Association football defenders
Racing Club de Montevideo players
Flamurtari Vlorë players
Villa Teresa players
C.A. Cerro players
Kategoria Superiore players
Uruguayan expatriate sportspeople in Albania
Expatriate footballers in Albania